T. Surendra Reddy (born 5 April 1960) is an Indian cinematographer known for his works with director Mani Shankar in the Hindi film industry. He is known for his work in films such as Rudraksh, which was released in 2005. He is the pioneer of digital filmmaking in India. "Toss" is the first digital film in India to be shot with the Thomson Viper Filmstream camera by him.

Biography

Works in multiple languages
He has shot on more than 50 feature films as an independent cinematographer in multiple languages and various cities, including Hyderabad, Chennai, Bangalore, Cochin and Mumbai. T.Surendra Reddy’s distinct experience includes feature films, documentaries, commercials, television serials and shooting a wide range of formats from Negative Film stock to Digital Filming. His collaboration with Indian cinema brought out notable North and South Indian films like Rudraksh - Tango Charlie (Hindi), Alexander - Kunthi Putra(kannada), Thilagam(Tamil), Aa Naluguru - Pellaina Kothalo - Toss - Srimannarayana(Telugu).
Along with feature films,  Surendra Reddy has been worked as a cameraman more than thousand TV episodes and hundreds of TV commercials.

Early life
T. Surendra Reddy was born in Parlapalli Village in Nellore District. Due to the desire to be a cameraman, he first worked as a "Mitchell studio camera" attender at "Murugalaya Studio". A few months after learning about the camera, in the profession in order to gain more knowledge; he worked with veteran cinematographers like, K. S. Hari, S. S. Lal, K. A. Jyothi, J. J. Vijayam, Lakshman Ghore, Dasaratharam, N. S. Raju, K. S. Mani and also with his friend Chota K Naidu. 
Around 40 films in 10 years span he worked as an assistant cameraman.
When working with various cameramen for more excellence in the profession without wasting time, he used to read books on photography in the American Library of Madras when he had time. While working in cinemas, he was working as a helper to the television serial cameraman Sri Vijay Kumar to hold on to the ever-growing electronic media.

Electronic media
Surendra Reddy, who had a chance to work as a cameraman for the TV serial Tenali Ramakrishna directed by Mani Shankar in 1990 and later worked as a cinematographer for the film Margadarsi directed by B. S. Narayana in 1991 and made a distinctive identity in the electronic media and film industry.

Filmography

As cinematographer

Awards and nominations

References

External links

Living people
Telugu film cinematographers
1960 births
Cinematographers from Andhra Pradesh